Jeffrey Richard (born March 24, 1979) is a Canadian curler from Lake Country, British Columbia.

To date, Richard has won two provincial championships and has made two Brier appearances. In 2010, Richard won the 2010 BC Men's provincial as skip.
 
In 2016, Richard joined Team Geall.

In 2017, Richard played in the Canadian Mixed Doubles with Sarah Wark

In 2018, Richard would win his second provincial title, defeating Team Cotter in the final in an extra end.

Personal life
Jeff Richard grown up in family of curlers: his father is Gerry Richard, curler and coach, World and Canadian champion; his sister Jeanna Schraeder played third in team of Kelly Scott, she is World and Canadian champion.

Richard is the manager at Sunset Ranch Golf & Country Club in Kelowna. He is married to Brooklyn Leitch and has one son.

References

External links
 

1979 births
Living people
Canadian male curlers
Curlers from British Columbia
Sportspeople from Kelowna
Canada Cup (curling) participants